Louis Frederick Bernecker (1876–1937) was an American artist, active as a painter, illustrator, and graphic artist in late-nineteenth- and early twentieth-century New York. He is known to have painted the angel murals (painted on canvas) decorating the interior of St. Gregory the Great's Church, New York City, and to have painted the November 1906 and March 1907 covers of Pearson's Magazine. In 1931, Bernecker was elected into the National Academy of Design as an Associate member.

References 

1876 births
1937 deaths
19th-century American painters
American male painters
20th-century American painters
19th-century American male artists
20th-century American male artists